The Embassy of Colombia in Buenos Aires is the diplomatic mission of the Republic of Colombia to the Argentine Republic; it is headed by the Ambassador of Colombia to Argentina. It is located in the Retiro neighbourhood of Buenos Aires, near San Martín Palace, Patio Bullrich, and the Isaac Fernández Blanco Museum of Hispanic-American Art, precisely at Carlos Pellegrini 1363 at the intersection of Via Pasquale Stanislao Mancini, and it is serviced by the Retiro station.

The Embassy is charged with representing the interests of the President and Government of Colombia, improving diplomatic relations between Colombia and the accredited countries, promoting and improving the image and standing of Colombia in the accredited nations, promoting the Culture of Colombia, encouraging and facilitating tourism to and from Colombia, and ensuring the safety of Colombians abroad.

The Embassy is located on the third floor of the building; also housed there is the Consulate General of Brazil in Buenos Aires on the fifth floor of the building.

See also
Argentina-Colombia relations

References

External links
 

Buenos Aires
Colombia
Argentina–Colombia relations